The Evangelical Reformed Church in Valais or in French the Église réformée évangélique du Valais or Evangelisch-Reformierte Kirche des Wallis is a Reformed cantonal State church in Valais.

It has 12 parishes and 17 ministers represents more than 20,000 members, but the number is increasing, because the move of the Reformed people to the canton from other Swiss cantons. It has 12 congregations in the Canton, in Brig, Visp, Leukerbad, Sierre, Crans-Montana, Sion, Coude Rhone Martigny-Saxon, 2 Rivers, Monthey, Haut-Lac. Women ordination is allowed.

References

External links 
www.erkw.ch/cms/index.php?id=4&L=1&MP=4-69 Official website

Valais
Valais